Michael A. Steele (born 1982) is an American politician of the Republican Party. He is a member of the Washington House of Representatives, representing the 12th Legislative District since first being elected in 2017. He previously served on the White House staff during the George W. Bush administration as a member of the Political Affairs Team.

Early life and career
Steele was born and raised in Chelan, Washington. After graduating from Pacific Lutheran University, he served on the White House staff as a member of the Political Affairs Team during the George W. Bush administration and as a staff member for the Washington House of Representatives Republican Caucus. He is the executive director of the Lake Chelan Chamber of Commerce.

Political career
Steele served on the Chelan, Washington city council from 2012 to 2016. He ran for the state legislature following the announcement that Brad Hawkins would run for the State Senate. Steele won in 2016 with 60% of the vote over Republican Jerry Paine.

Awards 
 2020 Guardians of Small Business. Presented by NFIB.

References

Washington (state) city council members
Republican Party members of the Washington House of Representatives
Living people
21st-century American politicians
People from Chelan, Washington
George W. Bush administration personnel
Pacific Lutheran University alumni
1982 births